Marc Schneider may refer to:
 Marc Schneider (footballer) (born 1980), retired Swiss footballer
 Marc Schneider (rower) (born 1973), American rower

See also
Mark Schneider (disambiguation)